Sloaneana is a genus of beetles in the family Carabidae, containing the following species:

 Sloaneana lamingtonensis Baehr, 2002
 Sloaneana similis Baehr, 2002
 Sloaneana tasmaniae (Sloane, 1915)

References

Trechinae